Violante is an oil painting attributed to Titian, dated to around 1515 and now held at the Kunsthistorisches Museum in Vienna.

History
The work was part of the Venetian collection of Bartolomeo della Nave and in 1636, it was sold to the Duke of Hamilton, who brought it to London. In 1659, it was acquired by Archduke Leopold Wilhelm of Austria, whose collection later became part of the current museum.

The title refers to the traditional identification with Violante, the daughter of painter Palma the Elder (to whom the painting was assigned for a long time), which has however no proof. An etching by David Teniers the Younger show the painting having larger size, although a representation of the archduke's gallery from the same artist depicts it in the same current size. The painting must have been a popular painting when it was in the Archduke's cabinet, as it was portrayed in his gallery paintings.

The work was attributed to Titian by Italian art historian Roberto Longhi. The woman portrayed is very similar to that in the Balbi Holy Conversation and a series of portraits of wavy-haired blonde women such as the Woman at the Mirror, Flora, the Vanity, Salome and the Young Woman with Black Dress.

Notes

References 
 

1515 paintings
Portraits by Titian
Paintings in the collection of the Kunsthistorisches Museum
Portraits of women
Paintings in the collection of the Archduke Leopold Wilhelm of Austria